Franc Palme (14 December 1914 – 27 February 1946) was a Slovenian ski jumper.

Career 
Palme competed in 1930s for the Kingdom of Yugoslavia. He took 43rd place on small hill at the 1936 Winter Olympics in Garmisch-Partenkirchen. In February 1934, he won the national championships at the opening competition Bloudkova velikanka in Planica. At this opening competition he also set first two hill records with 55 and 60 meters. At the time, these two jumps were national.

Winter Olympics

References

External links
 

Slovenian male ski jumpers
1914 births
1946 deaths
Olympic ski jumpers of Yugoslavia
Ski jumpers at the 1936 Winter Olympics
Skiers from Ljubljana